The Summerside Outer Range Lights are a set of range lights near Summerside, Prince Edward Island, Canada. They were built in 1991, and are still active.

See also
 List of lighthouses in Prince Edward Island
 List of lighthouses in Canada

References

External links
Picture of Summerside Outer Range Front Light
Picture of Summerside Outer Range Rear Light
 Aids to Navigation Canadian Coast Guard

Lighthouses completed in 1991
Lighthouses in Prince Edward Island
1991 establishments in Prince Edward Island
Buildings and structures in Summerside, Prince Edward Island